Kuristiku (Estonian for "Gorge") is a subdistrict in the district of Lasnamäe, Tallinn, the capital of Estonia. It has a population of 11,109.

Gallery

References

Subdistricts of Tallinn